Gegen Engeland was a German language daily newspaper published from Brest, France between 1940 and 1944. It was published by the German Navy, and was circulated amongst German troops in Brittany and Normandy. Initially it had a 44x30 cm format, later it switched to 59x42 cm format. The newspaper was printed at the printing house of local newspaper Depeche de Brest.

The newspaper title is taken from a German patriotic song Wir fahren gegen Engeland [We sail to take on England] or simply Das Engelandlied [The England-song], written in 1914 by Hermann Löns (a poet who served in the German Army and was killed in World War I) and then set to music. The song was popular in the German Imperial German Navy and later in the Kriegsmarine and among the German people, where it is still humorously quoted.

References

Defunct newspapers published in France
German-language newspapers published in Europe
Mass media in Brest, France
Newspapers established in 1940
Publications disestablished in 1944
1940 establishments in France
1944 disestablishments in France